Lake View High School is a public four-year high school located in the Lake View neighborhood on the north side of Chicago, Illinois, United States. Lake View is a part of the Chicago Public Schools district. While the current building opened in 1886, the school itself opened in 1874, dating to a time when the Lake View community was not a part of the city of Chicago. Lake View became a part of Chicago in 1889. Created when the Lake View area was its own township before it joined Chicago, the school is the oldest operating township secondary school in the state of Illinois.

Parts of the film My Bodyguard were filmed at Lake View High School.

Academics and activities
Lake View High School earned a bronze medal in the U.S. News/School Matters Best High School rankings.

The school offers approximately 20 clubs and activities for students.  Among those which are chapters or branches of nationally notable organizations are National Honor Society and Key Club.

Athletics
Lake View competes in the Chicago Public League (CPL), and is a member of the Illinois High School Association (IHSA).  Teams are stylized as the Wildcats. The boys' track & field team finished second at the first IHSA State Meet in 1892–93, and its boys' soccer team finished fourth in the IHSA State Tournament in 2008–09.

In the years before World War Two, the school had a fifty-foot rifle range in the basement and fielded a rifle team.

Feeder patterns
K-8 schools which feed into Lake View include Audubon, Bell, Blaine, Burley, Greeley, Hamilton, Jahn, Nettelhorst, and Schneider.

Notable alumni

 Clarence Appelgran, football player who played for the Detroit Heralds in 1920
 Edgar Bergen, ventriloquist, radio personality and actor; father of actress Candice Bergen
 Barbara Bedford, actress in films from 1920 to 1945
 Tom Bosley, Tony Award-winning actor, best known for his work on television (Happy Days, Father Dowling Mysteries and Murder, She Wrote)
 Alfred Caldwell, landscape architect
 Shirley Bell Cole, radio actress, best known for portraying Little Orphan Annie
 Myron Hunt, architect whose work included the Rose Bowl
Leo Koretz,  lawyer and stockbroker who ran an elaborate Ponzi scheme 
 Mark LaValle, Olympic weightlifter
 Vince Lawrence, platinum award-winning dance music producer, businessman and one of the leading innovators of house music
Joe Mooshil, Former Associated Press sportswriter and speaker on The Sportswriters on TV
 Gladys Nilsson, artist and original member of the Hairy Who group of Chicago Imagists
 Tom Rosenberg, film producer
 Howard Rubenstein, 1949, physician, photographer, playwright
 Jasper Sanfilippo Sr., leader of John B. Sanfilippo & Son, Inc. nut business, collector and philanthropist
 Abe Saperstein, founder, owner, and coach of the Harlem Globetrotters.
 Stuart Schwartz, television producer
 Gloria Swanson, Golden Globe award-winning actress, perhaps best remembered for her role as Norma Desmond in the film Sunset Boulevard
 Richard Thieme (class of 1961), priest, consultant, and author
 Bryant Washburn, actor
 Sidney R. Yates, U. S. Representative (1949–63, 1965–99) for Illinois' 9th congressional district
 Lee Balterman, (class of 1938), 1920–2012, Chicago Photographer, carrying a camera until the end, noted photographer of ballet, sports and Chicago street scenes.
Albin Garfield Anderson, medical missionary who spent 30 years of service caring for patients in Korea.

References

External links
 Official website
 Official CPS page for Lake View High School

Educational institutions established in 1874
Public high schools in Chicago
1874 establishments in Illinois